X force, Force X, or other variations may refer to:

 x force or force x (physics), an unknown force
 x force or force x (physics), an axial component of force, a force vector
 x force or force x, an unknown organization (particularly, criminal, political, or (para-)military)
 "X force", an unknown physical force, see Fifth force
 X Force (World War II) a unit of the Chinese army based in India commanded by U.S. theatre general Stilwell
 X-Force, a fictional mutant superhero team in Marvel Comics' X-Men universe
 X-Force (comic book), a comic book series featuring the eponymous team, see X-Force
 Uncanny X-Force, a comic book series featuring the X-Force team
 Cable and X-Force, a comic book series starring the eponymous team and the character Cable
 X-Force (film), a future film in the 20th Century Fox X-Men film franchise Deadpool film series featuring the eponymous Marvel Comics superhero team with Cable and Deadpool

See also
 Y Force (WWII)
 Z Force (disambiguation)
 Force (disambiguation)
 X (disambiguation)